A kumbha  is a type of pottery in India. Traditionally, it is made by Kumbhars, also known as Prajapatis.

In the context of Hindu, Jain and Buddhist mythology, the kumbha symbolises the womb. It represents fertility, life, generative power of human beings and sustenance and is generally associated with devis, particularly Ganga.

Mythological origin 
According to Hindu mythology, the first kumbha was created by Prajapati on the occasion of the marriage of Shiva, so he was first kumbhara "potter". Another myth says that the first pot was created by Vishvakarman on the occasion of the churning of the ocean for the first Amrit Sanchar.

In Hindu mythology and scriptures, several references are found of human beings born from kumbha. A legend states that rishi Agastya was born out of a kumbha. 

In several religious ceremonies and rituals, kumbhas or kalashas filled with water and leaves and decorated with intricate motifs, sometimes with ornaments, play an important role in ancient India. These rituals still survive in India.

In Hindu astrology, the kumbha stands for the zodiac sign Aquarius and is ruled by 2 important planets that is (Saturn and Rahu). Kumbha is also associated with the Kumbha Mela, which happens when the planet Brihaspati moves into Aquarius.

In Hindu epic Ramayana, Ravana's brother Kumbhakarna had a son named Kumbha, who was killed by Sugriva.

With time professions turned in to last names e.g. the last name Kumbha refers to one of the surnames of Schedule tribe Community named Yerukala in Andhra Pradesh.

See also 
 Kumbha rashi, name of zodiac sign Aquarius in sanskrit
 Kumbha Mela
 Kalasha
 Matki (earthen pot)
 Bumpa, a Tibetan Buddhist pot

References 

General

Dictionary of Hindu Lore and Legend by Anna Dallapiccola

Hindi words and phrases
Indian pottery
Hindu symbols